is a side-scrolling hack-and-slash game developed and released by Taito for arcades in 1992. It was also released with Taito Legends 2 for PC, PlayStation 2 and Xbox.

Gameplay

Arabian Magic has seven different stages, each with one of the powerful guardians awaiting the player at the end of each level. Each guardian, once defeated, will drop a jewel which forms a part of the Jewel of Seven Colors. Guardians, once defeated, will join the player and become a spirit you can summon using the same button as the genie.

Each level is littered with vases and wooden chests which, when broken, reveal treasure items and power-ups. The game has slight RPG elements in that stats, such as life, can be raised. The four player characters have the ability to summon a huge genie. The genie only stays on screen for a moment, but can be indirectly controlled to attack enemies with powerful blows.

Plot
The game is set in the mythical world of The Arabian Nights. Some time ago, the Evil One plagued the peaceful kingdom of Shahariyard. In order to save the King - who, by sorcery, had been transformed into a monkey - a group of heroes must find the Jewel of Seven Colors and release the evil hex. However, formidable monsters are lurking along their path.

Prince Rassid, Princess Lisa, Sinbad and Afshaal, each armed with their own special magic and powers, set out on the quest for the Jewel of Seven Colors. Suspenseful battle scenes, skillful sword fights and a "magic lamp," which fells all enemies in a single blow, await the players. Their adventure to restore peace to the kingdom now begins. The game ends when the player has recovered the Jewel of Seven Colors, saved the King (making him human, in the process) and restored peace to Shahariyard.

Characters
Each player can select from four distinctive characters: 
 Prince Rassid - the sword-wielding hero, is a well-rounded character who has excellent speed and fast attacks.
 Princess Lisa - she has excellent reach with her magical scarf, magic-based attacks and also has a special spinning move, performed by tapping forward twice. She is a fast character but suffers defensively.
 Sinbad - is a powerful character with a very useful flaming sword attack, done by holding the attack button and then releasing.
 Afshaal - much like Lisa, Afshaal has excellent reach with his mace and also has a similar spinning attack done in the same manner. He has high defense but suffers in speed.

Reception 
In Japan, Game Machine listed Arabian Magic on their November 1, 1992 issue as being the eighteenth most-successful table arcade unit of the month.

Kurt Kalata of Hardcore Gaming 101 compared the game to Sega's beat 'em up Arabian Fight (1992), noting both had a similar Arabian Nights theme and four-player co-op. He said Arabian Fight had more impressive graphics, but Arabian Magic was "the better game" in terms of gameplay.

Notes

References

External links
 Arabian Magic at Arcade History
 

1992 video games
Arcade video games
Taito beat 'em ups
Fantasy video games
Video games based on Arabian mythology
Video games featuring female protagonists
Side-scrolling beat 'em ups
Cooperative video games
Taito arcade games
Taito F3 System games
Video games developed in Japan